The 2000 Caribbean Football Union Club Championship was an international club football competition held in the Caribbean to determine the region's qualifiers to the CONCACAF Champions' Cup.
The winners Joe Public F.C. advanced to CONCACAF Champions' Cup 2000.

History
Originally a final tournament with 8 teams was planned, with as participants:
Joe Public FC (holders)
Tivoli Gardens (1999/2000 NPL Heroes' Cup winners)
Camdonia Chelsea FC (1999 St.Vincent club champion)
Club Franciscain (1998/99 Ligue de Football de *Martinique champion)
Defence Force (1999 PFL champion)
Notre Dame SC (1999 Premier League champion)
W Connection (PFL sub-champion)
Violette AC ( - replace champions )

This was to be held October 28 – November 5, 2000.

However, in preparation of a 'dramatically enhanced' CONCACAF club competition, the set-up was changed completely; 4 groups with 14 teams in all were formed; the winners of which to progress to the final championship round.  Of the above 8 teams, 3, viz. Chelsea, Notre Dame, and Defence Force, were suddenly not invited - on whatever criteria.

First round

Group A
played in Trinidad and Tobago

Group B
played in Jamaica

Group C
played in Antigua and Barbuda

Group D
Original list of participants:
 Club Franciscain - withdrew
 Carioca FC - won by default
 Café Sisserou Strikers - moved to Group C

Championship Group
played in Trinidad and Tobago

Joe Public FC advance to CONCACAF Champions' Cup 2000

Top scorers

2000
1